Jesse Woods Johnson (born June 1, 1960) is an American musician best known as the guitarist in the original lineup of The Time (more recently known as the Original 7ven).

Life and career
Johnson was born in Rock Island, Illinois. He moved to East St. Louis, Illinois at the age of nine and was raised by foster parents after his parents split up. At age 16 he moved back to Rock Island to live with his father Jackwood Johnson. Johnson began playing guitar when he was 15, honing his chops in local rock bands such as Treacherous Funk, Pilot, and Dealer, throughout his teens and early twenties. On a friend's recommendation, he moved to Minneapolis, Minnesota in 1981, where he met Morris Day and played briefly in Day's band which was called Enterprise. He then became the lead guitarist for The Time, a funk rock group formed by Prince.

Although Prince basically wrote and recorded the first two Time albums on his own with input from Morris Day, Johnson did contribute to another Prince project, Vanity 6, with a song called "Bite the Beat" co-written with Prince. On The Time's third album, Ice Cream Castle, Johnson contributed to the hit singles "The Bird" and "Jungle Love", which were helped by the popularity of the Purple Rain film.

However, at the height of The Time's popularity following Purple Rain, following the departure of Morris Day, Johnson left the band and with the help of Manager Owen Husney signed a solo deal with A&M Records in 1984 and released Jesse Johnson's Revue the following year. This album featured two other former members of The Time in Johnson's backing band, keyboardist Mark Cardenas and bassist Jerry Hubbard. Three songs were released from the album: "Be Your Man", "Can You Help Me" and "I Want My Girl", a slow song about a fateful relationship. Then came the funk non-album outing "Free World". His second album Shockadelica was released in 1986 containing the hit single "Crazay", a duet with Sly Stone, and his third album Every Shade of Love followed in 1988. Throughout the late 1980s and early 1990s Johnson also featured on the soundtracks to the Breakfast Club (contributing "Heart Too Hot to Hold", a duet with Stephanie Spruill), Pretty in Pink, Another 48 Hrs. and White Men Can't Jump.

Johnson has produced a wide variety of artists, most notably Janet Jackson, Paula Abdul, TaMara and the Seen, After 7, Da Krash, Kool Skool, Debbie Allen, Cheryl Lynn, and Les Rita Mitsouko.

By 1990, The Time reformed and issued Pandemonium, which was more of a group effort than their former albums. The album allowed Johnson to contribute his hard rock guitar sound to several tracks.

After the band dissolved once again, Johnson remained in the background for several years, quietly contributing to soundtracks and other artists. His music he recorded for the film A Time to Kill was not released on the soundtrack but can be heard in the film. Finally in 1996, Johnson released another album, Bare My Naked Soul on the Dinosaur Entertainment label. The album was a departure from his funk-filled albums from the 1980s and instead verged into blues and hard rock.

Four years later, the highlights of Johnson's solo albums were collected on his Ultimate Collection, the album includes B-sides, 12" versions, album tracks, and one previously unreleased song called "Vibe".

After a nearly 14-year absence from the music scene, Johnson released a new double album Verbal Penetration in 2009.

In February 2012, Johnson served as house guitarist behind a host of all-star blues musicians in the PBS special "In Performance at the White House: Red, White and Blues". Other members of the house band included Booker T. Jones, Bobby Ross Avila, Narada Michael Walden, Ernie Fields, Jr., Freddie Hendrix and Fred Wesley. Performers included B.B. King, Buddy Guy, Mick Jagger, Jeff Beck, Warren Haynes, Derek Trucks, Susan Tedeschi, Keb Mo, Trombone Shorty and Gary Clark, Jr.

Solo discography

Studio albums

Compilation albums
Ultimate Collection (2000, Hip-O Records)

Singles

References

External links

Jesse Johnson's official website

1960 births
Living people
People from Rock Island, Illinois
Musicians from St. Louis
The Original 7ven members
American funk guitarists
American male guitarists
Guitarists from Missouri
African-American musicians
20th-century American guitarists
20th-century American male musicians